The Strelitziaceae comprise a family of monocotyledonous flowering plants, very similar in appearance and growth habit to members of the related families Heliconiaceae and Musaceae (banana family). The three genera with seven species of Strelitziaceae have been included in Musaceae in some classifications, but are generally recognized as a separate family in more recent treatments such as the APG II system (2003).  The APG II system assigns the Strelitziaceae to the order Zingiberales in the commelinid clade.

Taxonomy 
The Strelitziaceae include three genera, all occurring in tropical to subtropical regions: Strelitzia with five species in southern Africa, Ravenala with a single species in Madagascar, and Phenakospermum with a single species in northern South America.  The best-known species is the bird-of-paradise flower Strelitzia reginae, grown for its flowers worldwide in tropical and subtropical gardens, and a well-known flower in floristry.  The other species of Strelitzia have less colourful flowers and are grown instead for their striking foliage. Also grown for its foliage is the traveller's tree, Ravenala madagascariensis.

References

Bibliography

External links 
 Strelitziaceae in Stevens, P. F. (2001 onwards). Angiosperm Phylogeny Website. Version 7, May 2006 [and more or less continuously updated since].

 
 

 
Commelinid families